ACTV may refer to:

 File Transfer Protocol#Protocol overview 
 Actv S.p.A. (Azienda del Consorzio Trasporti Veneziano), Italian public transit company
 Motoactv, the Motorola ACTV smartwatch
 ACTV Japan, television production company
Antenne Centre Télévision, a Belgian television station
 Acatinga virus (ACTV)
 Arizona Capital Television, which provides coverage of the Arizona State Legislature